Edward Joseph Cahill (10 September 1902 – 21 July 1968) was an Australian rules footballer who played with Footscray in the Victorian Football League (VFL).

In April 1939 Cahill was found guilty of running a gaming house in his shop, and was fined £10.

References

External links 
		

1902 births
1968 deaths
Australian rules footballers from Victoria (Australia)
Western Bulldogs players
Subiaco Football Club players